In mathematics, specifically in number theory, Newman's conjecture is a conjecture about the behavior of the partition function modulo any integer.  Specifically, it states that for any integers  and  such that , the value of the partition function  satisfies the congruence  for infinitely many non-negative integers .  It was formulated by mathematician Morris Newman in 1960. It is unsolved as of 2020.

History
Oddmund Kolberg was probably the first to prove a related result, namely that the partition function takes both even and odd values infinitely often. The proof employed was of elementary nature and easily accessible, and was proposed as an exercise by Newman in the American Mathematical Monthly.

1 year later, in 1960, Newman proposed the conjecture and proved the cases m=5 and 13 in his original paper, and m=65 two years later.

Ken Ono, an American mathematician, made further advances by exhibiting sufficient conditions for the conjecture to hold for prime .

He used the result, together with a computer program, to prove the conjecture for all primes less than 1000 (except 3). Ahlgren expanded on his result to show that Ono's condition is, in fact, true for all composite numbers coprime to 6.

Three years later, Ono showed that for every prime  greater than 3, one of the following must hold:

Using computer technology, he proved the theorem for all primes less than 200,000 (except 3).

Afterwards, Ahlgren and Boylan used Ono's criterion to extend Newman's conjecture to all primes except possibly 3. 2 years afterwards, they extended their result to all prime powers except powers of 2 or 3.

Partial progress and solved cases 
The weaker statement that  has at least 1 solution has been proved for all . It was settled by Ken Ono.

References 

Unsolved problems in number theory
Analytic number theory